WAXS (94.1 FM) is a classic hits formatted broadcast radio station licensed to Oak Hill, West Virginia, serving Beckley/Oak Hill/Hinton area.  WAXS is owned and operated by Southern Communications.

External links
Groovy 94.1 Online

AXS-FM
Radio stations established in 1948
Oldies radio stations in the United States
Classic hits radio stations in the United States
1948 establishments in West Virginia